The Sir Hans Krebs Lecture and Medal is awarded annually by the Federation of European Biochemical Societies (FEBS) for outstanding achievements in Biochemistry and Molecular Biology or related sciences.

It was endowed by the Lord Rank Centre for Research and named after the German-born British biochemist Sir Hans Adolf Krebs, well known for identifying the urea and citric acid cycles. The awardee receives a silver medal and presents one of the plenary lectures at the FEBS Congress.

List of recipients
Source: (1968–2002) 

2022 Cecília Rodrigues (University of Lisbon, Portugal)
2019 Mathias Uhlen
2018 Albert J.R. Heck
2017 Carol V. Robinson
2016 Kári Stefánsson
2015 Jürgen Knoblich
2014 Michael N. Hall
2013 Richard J. Roberts
2012 V. Ramakrishnan 
2011 Elena Conti
2010 Harald Stenmark
2009 Václav Hořejší
2008 Tim Hunt
2007 Tom Rapoport
2006 Aaron Ciechanover
2005 Thomas Jenuwein
2004 Ryszard Gryglewski
2003 No award?
2002 Jacques Pouysségur
2001 Sir Philip Cohen
2000 Thomas Steitz
1999 Stanley B. Prusiner
1998 Bengt I. Samuelsson 
1997 David Baltimore
1996 Josef Stefaan Schell
1995 Kim Nasmyth
1994 Jean-Pierre Changeux
1993 Christiane Nüsslein-Volhard 
1992 Robert Huber 
1991 No Award
1990 Pierre Chambon
1989 Helmut Beinert
1988 No award
1987 Tom Blundell
1986 Gottfried Schatz
1985 Robert Joseph Paton Williams 
1984 Richard Henderson
1983 Arthur Kornberg
1982 François Jacob
1981 Cesar Milstein 
1980 Sydney Brenner (No lecture due to illness)
1979 Pierre Desnuelle
1978 Peter D. Mitchell
1977 Francis Crick
1976 No award
1975 Heinz-Gunter Wittmann 
1974 Charles Weissmann 
1973 Arthur B. Pardee
1972 Ephraim Katchalski
1971 David Chilton Phillips
1970 No Award
1969 Alexander Spirin
1968 Max Perutz (inaugural award)

See also

 List of biochemistry awards

References

Awards established in 1968
Biochemistry awards
European science and technology awards